State Route 173  (SR 173) is a state highway in Unicoi and Carter counties in the U.S. state of Tennessee. It connects the town of Unicoi with the community of Tiger Valley.

Route description
SR 173 begins in Unicoi County at Interstate 26/U.S. Route 19W/U.S. Route 23 (I-26/US 19W/US 23) exit 32 in the town of Unicoi. It goes eastward for several blocks before turning southward onto Unicoi Drive. SR 173 follows Unicoi Drive for less than a mile to a junction with SR 107, which approaches from Erwin to the south. The merged SR 107/SR 173 goes eastward through rural mountain areas until reaching the community of Limestone Cove, where SR 107 turns southward toward the North Carolina border, and SR 173 turns northeastward through rural mountainous terrain to cross into Carter County and enter the community of Tiger Valley, where it comes to an end at US 19E. From here, US 19E continues eastward to Roan Mountain, and northwestward to Hampton.

Major intersections

References

External links

173
Transportation in Unicoi County, Tennessee
Transportation in Carter County, Tennessee